Notable people with the name Overton include:

Surname
 Al Overton, Jr., American sound engineer
 Anthony Overton (1865–1946), American banker and manufacturer
 Ben Overton (1926–2012), Chief Justice for the Florida Supreme Court
 Bo Overton, American basketball coach
 Cathy Overton-Clapham (born 1969), Canadian curler
 Charles Overton (1805–1889), English cleric and writer
 Claude Overton (1927–1996), American professional basketball player
 Connor Overton (born 1993), American baseball player
 Constantine Overton, English Quaker leader
 Craig Overton (born 1994), English cricketer
 David M. Overton, American restaurateur
 Dillon Overton, American baseball player
 Diondre Overton (born 1998), American football player
 Dolphin D. Overton (1926–2013), American aviator
 Don Overton, American football player
 Doug Overton, American basketball player
 Edward Overton, Jr. (1836–1903), United States representative from Pennsylvania
 Elli Overton, Canadian/Australian swimmer
 Ernest Overton (1865–1933), British physiologist and biologist
 Esther Overton (born 1990), Australian swimmer
 Frank Overton (1918–1967), American actor
 Fred Overton, American basketball coach
 Guy Overton, New Zealand cricketer
 Hall Overton, American composer
 Iain Overton, British writer and journalist
 Jamie Overton (born 1994), English cricketer
 Jeff Overton (born 1983), American golfer
 John Overton (disambiguation)
 Joseph P. Overton (1960–2003), American political activist, creator of the Overton window concept
 Josh Overton, (1990-Present) Designer from London UK 
 Kelly Overton, American activist
 Macon C. Overton, U.S. Marine officer, namesake of USS Overton
 Matt Overton (born 1985), American football player
 Nancy Overton, American singer
 Norris W. Overton (born 1926), Brigadier General in the United States Air Force
 Peter Overton, Australian television journalist
 Richard Overton (disambiguation)
 Rick Overton (born 1954), American screenwriter, actor and comedian
 Robert Overton (c.1609–1678), English Major General in the New Model Army
 Spencer Overton (born 1968), American lawyer and law scholar
 Thomas Overton (1753–1824), American military and political leader
 Tom Overton (1930–1988), American sound engineer
 Virginia Overton (1971), American artist
 Volma Overton (1924–2005), American civil rights activist
 Walter Hampden Overton, U.S. Congressman
 Watkins Overton (1894–1958), American politician
 Wendy Overton (born 1947), American tennis player
 Wil Overton, British artist
 Willis Overton, American psychologist
 William Overton (bishop) (c.1525 – 1609), Church of England clergyman, Bishop of Coventry and Lichfield 
 William Overton (judge) (1939–1987), United States district court judge
 William Overton (Portland founder), American Mountain Man and founder of Portland, Oregon
 Winston Overton (1870–1934), Justice of the Louisiana Supreme Court

Given name
 Overton Vertis Wright (1939–1980),  American singer O. V. Wright